The following is a list of awards and nominations received by English actor Colin Firth, known for his roles in film, television, and theatre.

Colin Firth has received two Academy Award for Best Actor nominations winning for his performance as King George VI in Tom Hooper's historical drama The King's Speech (2010). He also received two BAFTA Awards, a Golden Globe Award and three Screen Actors Guild Awards.

He received two British Academy Television Award nominations for his roles in the BBC projects Tumbledown (1989), and Pride and Prejudice (1996). He also received three British Academy Film Award nominations for Bridget Jones' Diary (2000), A Single Man (2009), and The King's Speech (2010), winning for the later two. He also received a Golden Globe Award for Best Actor – Motion Picture Drama and a Screen Actors Guild Award for Outstanding Performance by a Male Actor in a Leading Role for his role in the King's Speech. He also received Screen Actors Guild Award for Outstanding Cast in a Motion Picture nominations for The English Patient (1996), and Shakespeare in Love (1998) winning for The King's Speech. 

For his work on television he received two Primetime Emmy Award nominations for Outstanding Supporting Actor in a Limited or Anthology Series or Movie for his role in the BBC / HBO film Conspiracy (2001), and Outstanding Lead Actor in a Limited or Anthology Series or Movie for the HBO limited series The Staircase (2022).

Major associations

Academy Awards

BAFTA Awards

Golden Globe Awards

Emmy Awards

Screen Actors Guild Awards

Critic awards

Critics' Choice Awards

European Film Awards

Other awards

References 

Lists of awards received by British actor